Krtina is a small settlement in the Municipality of Trebnje in eastern Slovenia. It lies on the left bank of the Temenica River east of Šentlovrenc on the regional road to Trebnje. The area is part of the historical region of Lower Carniola. The municipality is now included in the Southeast Slovenia Statistical Region.

References

External links
Krtina at Geopedia

Populated places in the Municipality of Trebnje